Laurent Robuschi (born 5 October 1935) is a French former football striker, with Italian ancestors. He was part of France national football team at the FIFA World Cup 1966.
He is also the maternal grandfather of Anthony Gonzalez, known for his work in the band M83.

References
Profile
Stats

1935 births
Living people
French footballers
France international footballers
Association football forwards
Ligue 1 players
AS Monaco FC players
AS Cannes players
FC Girondins de Bordeaux players
Olympique de Marseille players
1966 FIFA World Cup players